Jitendra Patwari (born 19 November 1973) is an Indian politician from the Indian National Congress. He was the Cabinet Minister for Higher Education, Sports and Youth Affairs of Madhya Pradesh.

He is the Member of the Legislative Assembly from Rau Vidhan Sabha in Madhya Pradesh. He is the member of the INC.

Early life and education
He was born in Bijalpur, a small town near Indore, on 19 November 1973, to Ramesh Chandra Kodarlal Patwari and Pirak Bai Patwari. He has completed his schooling from Government Multi Malhar Ashram Higher Secondary School, Indore and then pursued his B.A. and L.L.B. degrees from Devi Ahilya Vishwavidyalaya Indore.

His grandfather Kodarlal Patwari served as a freedom fighter during the Indian independence movement. His father, Ramesh Chandra Patwari, is also an active leader of Indian National Congress.

Political career
He first became MLA in 2013 from Rau Vidhan Sabha. He is currently the Secretary of All India Congress Committee and is in charge of Gujarat Pradesh Congress Committee. He is also the Working President of the Madhya Pradesh Congress Committee as well as national media panelist of Indian National Congress. Earlier he was President of Madhya Pradesh Youth Congress.

He won election for the second time from Rau in 2018.

He was the Cabinet Minister of Higher Education, Youth and Sports Affairs in the Government of Madhya Pradesh, after Indian National Congress formed the government in Madhya Pradesh after 15 years but resigned after 2020 Madhya Pradesh political turmoil.

See also
Madhya Pradesh Legislative Assembly
2013 Madhya Pradesh Legislative Assembly election
2008 Madhya Pradesh Legislative Assembly election

References

External links
 

1973 births
Madhya Pradesh MLAs 2013–2018
20th-century Indian lawyers
Indian National Congress politicians from Madhya Pradesh
Politicians from Indore
Living people